The 2018 Gree China Cup International Football Championship (Chinese: 2018年格力中国杯国际足球锦标赛) was the second edition of the China Cup, an international football tournament held in China annually. It was played from 22 to 26 March 2018 in Nanning, Guangxi, China.

The winning team was Uruguay, who beat Wales 1–0 in the final.

Participating teams
On 8 November 2017, it was announced that Czech Republic, Uruguay and Wales would participate in the 2018 China Cup.

Mascot 

With 65,554 votes, Longbao was elected as the official mascot for the 2018 Gree China Cup International Football Championship. Longbao’s design was drawn from a Chinese dragon (Long), an essential cultural symbol of strength, good luck and auspicious powers.

Venues

Match officials
The following referees were chosen for the 2018 China Cup.
Referees

  Chris Beath
  Mohd Amirul Izwan Yaacob
  Saoud Ali Al-Adba
  Salman Ahmad Falahi

Assistant referees

  George Lakrindis
  Mohammad bin Zainal
  Juma Al-Burshaid
  Mohammad Darman

Squads
Age, caps and goals as of the start of the tournament, 22 March 2018.

China PR

Coach:  Marcello Lippi

Source:

Czech Republic

Coach:  Karel Jarolím

 

Source:

Uruguay

Coach:  Óscar Tabárez

Source:

Wales

Coach:  Ryan Giggs

Source:

Matches
The official draw was announced on 5 December 2017. The schedule was announced on 17 December 2017. All times are local, CST (UTC+8).

Bracket

Semi-finals

Third-place playoff

Final

Goalscorers
3 goals
 Gareth Bale

2 goals

 Edinson Cavani
 Sam Vokes

1 goal

 Fan Xiaodong
 Michael Krmenčík
 Patrik Schick
 Pavel Kadeřábek
 Tomáš Kalas
 Luis Suárez
 Harry Wilson

Notes

References

External links
 
2018 China Cup on Soccerway 
 

2018
International association football competitions hosted by China
2018 in association football
Sport in Guangxi
Nanning
2018 in Chinese football
March 2018 sports events in China